The commune of Rutovu is a commune of Bururi Province in south-western Burundi. The capital lies at Rutovu.

References

Communes of Burundi
Bururi Province